Itaquitinga is a city located in the state of Pernambuco, Brazil. Located  at 84 km away from Recife, capital of the state of Pernambuco. Has an estimated (IBGE 2020) population of 17,006 inhabitants.

Geography
 State - Pernambuco
 Region - Zona da mata Pernambucana
 Boundaries - Condado   (N);  Igarassu    (S);  Goiana   (E);  Nazaré da Mata and Tracunhaém   (W)
 Area - 103.44 km2
 Elevation - 88 m
 Hydrography - Goiana River
 Vegetation - Subcaducifólia forest
 Climate - Hot tropical and humid
 Annual average temperature - 23.3 c
 Distance to Recife - 84 km

Economy
The main economic activities in Itaquitinga are based in agribusiness, especially sugarcane (over 477,000 tons) and livestock such as cattle and chickens.

Economic indicators

Economy by Sector
2006

Health indicators

References

Municipalities in Pernambuco